Alsóegres is the Hungarian name for two villages in Romania:

 Agrișu de Jos village, Șieu-Odorhei Commune, Bistrița-Năsăud County
 Agrieșel village, Târlișua Commune, Bistrița-Năsăud County